Armando Filiput (19 December 1923 – 30 March 1982) was an Italian hurdler, European Champion in 1950. He was born and died in Ronchi dei Legionari.

Biography
Filiput has 22 caps in Italy national athletics team (from 1942 to 1945). In his career he participated in one edition of the Olympic Games and won the Italian Athletics Championships 7 times.

Achievements

National titles
7 wins in 400 metres hurdles at the Italian Athletics Championships (1946, 1949, 1950, 1951, 1952, 1953, 1954)

See also
 FIDAL Hall of Fame

References

External links
 

1923 births
1982 deaths
Italian male hurdlers
Olympic athletes of Italy
Athletes (track and field) at the 1952 Summer Olympics
European Athletics Championships medalists
Mediterranean Games gold medalists for Italy
Mediterranean Games bronze medalists for Italy
Athletes (track and field) at the 1951 Mediterranean Games
Athletes (track and field) at the 1955 Mediterranean Games
Mediterranean Games medalists in athletics
20th-century Italian people